Narona  was an Ancient Greek trading post on the Illyrian coast and later Roman city and bishopric, located in the Neretva valley in present-day Croatia, which remains a Latin Catholic titular see.

History 
It was founded as a Greek emporium in c. 3rd/2nd century BC. First time it is mentioned in the chapter 24 of the Periplus of Pseudo-Scylax. Narona became the major Roman stronghold in the 1st century BC. It was part of the Roman province of Dalmatia. In the 6th century AD, it came under Byzantine rule. The settlement ceased to be in 7th century after the arrival of Slavic tribes in the region.

Ecclesiastical history 
 In 530 was established a Diocese of Narona (Latin = Curiate Italian) / Naronen(sis) (Latin adjective), apparently suffragan of the Metropolitan Archdiocese of Salona (now Split).
 In 533 it lost territories to establish the Diocese of Makarska and the Diocese of Sarsenterum
 In 600 it was suppressed, the city being ruined, its territory being merged into the Diocese of Ragusa.

The only recorded bishop was
 Marcello (530? – 533?), who attended councils of bishops at Salona in both named years.

Titular see 
It was nominally restored in 1933 as Latin Titular bishopric of Narona.

It has had the following incumbents, mostly of the fitting Episcopal (lowest) rank, with an archiepiscopal exception :
 Leo Pietsch (1948.08.27 – death 1981.09.30) as Auxiliary Bishop of Graz–Seckau (Austria) (1948.08.27 – 1967) and on emeritate
Titular Archbishop: John Bulaitis (born England, UK) (1981.11.21 – 2010.12.25) as papal diplomat : Apostolic Pro-Nuncio to Republic of Congo (1981.11.21 – 1987.07.11), Apostolic Pro-Nuncio to Central African Republic (1981.11.21 – 1987.07.11), Apostolic Delegate to Chad (1981.11.21 – 1987.07.11), Apostolic Pro-Nuncio to Iran (1987.07.11 – 1991.11.30), Apostolic Pro-Nuncio to Korea (1991.11.30 – 1997.03.25), Apostolic Nuncio (ambassador) to Mongolia (1992.09.08 – 1997.03.25), Apostolic Nuncio to Albania (1997.03.25 – 2008.07.26); died 2010
  Helmut Karl Dieser (2011.02.24 – 2016.09.23) as Auxiliary Bishop of Trier (western Germany) (2011.02.24 – 2016.09.23); later Bishop of Aachen (Aix-la-Chapelle, Germany) (2016.09.23 – ...)
 Heriberto Cavazos Pérez (2016.10.31 – ...), as Auxiliary Bishop of Monterrey (Mexico) (2016.10.31 – ...).

Archeology 

In 1995 a Roman temple building was discovered, which had been dedicated by the governor Dolabella and contained statues of the emperors  Claudius and Vespasian, as well as two of Augustus and his wife Livia. The statues had been vandalized in the 4th century: they were lying on the floor and their heads had been broken off. The heads of Vespasian and one of the Livias had been acquired in the surrounding area by Arthur Evans in 1878. The heads were thus reunited with their bodies. The famous Roman statues have toured major European museums.

A cathedral and at least two more churches were dug up.

See also 
 List of Catholic dioceses in Croatia
 Dalmatia
 List of ancient cities in Illyria
 Salona

References

Sources and external links 
 Archeological Museum of Narona -Vid Croatia
 GCatholic - former & titular bishopric
 Pius Bonifacius Gams, Series episcoporum Ecclesiae Catholicae, Leipzig 1931, p. 410
 Nuovo bullettino di archeologia cristiana, 1906, p. 211

7th-century disestablishments
Illyrian Croatia
Archaeology of Illyria
Archaeological sites in Croatia
Roman towns and cities in Croatia
Greek colonies in Illyria
Former populated places in the Balkans

it:Diocesi di Narona